Sergey Petukhov (born 22 December 1983) is a Russian sprinter. He competed in the 4x400 metres relay event at the 2013 World Championships in Athletics.

References

External links
 

1983 births
Living people
Place of birth missing (living people)
Russian male sprinters
World Athletics Championships athletes for Russia
Russian Athletics Championships winners